Metopiora is a genus of moths of the family Noctuidae.

Species
 Metopiora sanguinata (Lucas, 1892)

References
Natural History Museum Lepidoptera genus database
Metopiora at funet

Hadeninae